Kiran Gurung is a Nepalese politician. He is a Central Committee member of the Communist Party of Nepal (Unified Marxist-Leninist). In the 2008 Constituent Assembly election he was elected from the Tanahu-3 constituency, winning 14786 votes.

In the Maoist led Government, Gurung was appointed as the Forest and Soil Conservation Minister.

References

Living people
Nepalese civil servants
Communist Party of Nepal (Unified Marxist–Leninist) politicians
Year of birth missing (living people)
Nepal MPs 1991–1994

Members of the 1st Nepalese Constituent Assembly